SLX1 structure-specific endonuclease subunit homolog B (S. cerevisiae) is a protein in humans that is encoded by the SLX1B gene.

This gene encodes a protein that is an important regulator of genome stability. The protein represents the catalytic subunit of the SLX1-SLX4 structure-specific endonuclease, which can resolve DNA secondary structures that are formed during repair and recombination processes. Two identical copies of this gene are located on the p arm of chromosome 16 due to a segmental duplication; this record represents the more telomeric copy. Alternative splicing results in multiple transcript variants. Read-through transcription also occurs between this gene and the downstream SULT1A4 (sulfotransferase family, cytosolic, 1A, phenol-preferring, member 4) gene. [provided by RefSeq, Nov 2010].

References

Further reading 

Genes on human chromosome 16